Out of My Head may refer to:

Music

Albums
 Out of My Head (album), by D4, 2005
 Out of My Head, by The Fools, 1983
 Out of My Head, an EP by Degenerates, 1989

Songs
 "Out of My Head" (Charli XCX song)
 "Out of My Head" (Fastball song)
 "Out of My Head" (John Newman song)
 "Out of My Head" (Lupe Fiasco song)
 "Out of My Head" (Mobile song)
 "Out of My Head", by the Black Eyed Peas from The E.N.D.
 "Out of My Head", by Chvrches from Love Is Dead
 "Out of My Head", by First Aid Kit from Palomino
 "Out of My Head", by Gramophonedzie
 "Out of My Head", by The Griswolds
 "Out of My Head", by Junkhouse from Strays
 "Out of My Head", by Kieran Goss
 "Out of My Head", by Loote
 "Out of My Head", by Prism from Jericho
 "Out of My Head", by Puddle of Mudd from Come Clean
 "Out of My Head", by Theory of a Deadman from The Truth Is...
 "Out of My Head", by Tom Cochrane from No Stranger
 "Out of My Head", by Winslow
 "Out of My Head", by The Wombats from Beautiful People Will Ruin Your Life
 "You Took the Happiness (Out of My Head)", by The Nitty Gritty Dirt Band from The Nitty Gritty Dirt Band

Books
 Out of My Head (Hors de moi), a 2003 novel by Didier Van Cauwelaert
 Out of My Head, a 1986 essay collection by Robert Bloch

See also
 Outta My Head (disambiguation)